Malmslätts AIK is a Swedish football club located in Linköping.

Background
Malmslätts AIK currently plays in Division 4 Östergötland Västra which is the sixth tier of Swedish football. They play their home matches at the Hellgrenshagen in Linköping.

Malmslätts AIK are affiliated to Östergötlands Fotbollförbund. Malmslätts AIK played in the 2006 Svenska Cupen but lost 6–0 away to Jönköpings Södra IF in the first round.

Season to season

Footnotes

External links
 Malmslätts AIK – Official website
 Malmslätts AIK on Facebook

Football clubs in Östergötland County